Taraqeh (also Romanized as Tarāqeh; also known as Torgheh) is a village in Il Teymur Rural District, in the Central District of Bukan County, West Azerbaijan Province, Iran. At the 2006 census, its population was 101, in 18 families.

References 

Populated places in Bukan County